Dysgonia torrida, the jigsaw, is a moth of the family Erebidae. The species was first described by Achille Guenée in 1852. It is found from the tropical and subtropical areas of Africa to Spain, southern Italy, Greece, Syria, Israel, Iran, Uzbekistan towards India, Sri Lanka and Myanmar.

Description
This species has a wingspan of 45–50 mm. Colors highly variable. Body red-brown. Antemedial line of the forewing being erect and having broad, white and slightly suffused band beyond it. Postmedial line angled also between veins 3 and 4 and sinuous towards inner margin. Apical streak broken up into two spots. Hindwings with a white medial band and outer margin greyish at center.

Ecology
There are multiple generations per year. In Europe adults are on wing from May to June and September. The larvae feed on Zea mays (Poaceae), Ricinus communis and Acalypha wilkesiana (Euphorbiaceae)

References

External links 
 
 African Moths
 Image

Dysgonia
Moths described in 1852
Moths of Cape Verde
Moths of the Comoros
Moths of Africa
Moths of Madagascar
Moths of Mauritius
Moths of the Middle East
Moths of Réunion
Moths of Seychelles
Moths of Asia
Moths of Europe